Anadasmus pelodes is a moth of the family Depressariidae. It is found in Mexico, Panama, Guyana and Brazil (Amazonas).

The wingspan is 25–26 mm. The forewings are light brownish, faintly purplish-tinged and with the extreme costal edge ochreous-whitish. The plical and second discal stigmata are small and dark fuscous and there is a series of faint cloudy fuscous dots from four-fifths of the costa to the dorsum before the tornus, rather curved outwards in the disc. A marginal series of cloudy dark fuscous dots is found around the apex and termen. The hindwings are rather dark grey.

References

Moths described in 1913
Anadasmus
Moths of North America
Moths of South America